BNS Nishan is a Durjoy-class semi-stealth large patrol craft of the Bangladesh Navy. She has been serving the Bangladesh Navy since 2017.

Career
The ship was launched on 15 March 2017. Honorable President of the Bangladesh, Md. Abdul Hamid commissioned the ship to the Bangladesh Navy on 8 November 2017.

On 10 September 2018, fishing trawler Swadhin-3 sank near Mongla port after a collision with a commercial vessel. 12 fishermen were on board the fishing trawler. BNS Turag responded quickly to rescue 9 fishermen alive.

Design
The ship has a bulbous bow that suggests it is very stable in heavy sea states. It has speed and range to support long lasting missions. It has a complement of 70 crews. She was mainly made to be used as Anti-submarine warfare ship.

Electronics
The primary sensor of the ship is a SR47AG surface and air search radar. The ship carries a Chinese TR47C fire control radar for main gun. For navigation, the ship uses the Japanese JMA 3336 radar. To help the navigational radar, the Vision Master chart radar is used.

Armament
The ASW LPC uses a Chinese origin single 76.2 mm (3 in) NG 16-1 naval gun as the primary gun. The vessel is also equipped with one CS/AN2 30 mm (1.2 in) single-barrel naval gun mounted amidships used as the secondary gun. She is armed with two triple 324 mm (13 in) torpedo tubes for ET-52C torpedo.

See also
 List of active ships of the Bangladesh Navy

References

Ships built at Khulna Shipyard
Durjoy-class LPC
2017 ships
Ships of the Bangladesh Navy
Patrol vessels of the Bangladesh Navy